Victor Chukwunonso Nite Jnr. (born 4 October 1985) also known by his popular music name Clef nite is a US-based Nigerian Afro classical guitarist, performer and music producer distinctively known for his percussive chord playing style on the Classical guitar.

Early life and education
Clef nite was born into the descendant of an art family. He is the first child of Engineer Victor Nworah Nite Snr. A citizen of Nise Awka South Local Government Area in Anambra State, Nigeria who also grew up into the arts lane of his family as a singer and dancer. 
Clef nite started loving music at a young age and will always stopped to watch anyone playing the guitar on television. Growing up with his parents, he gained a lot of support from them to pursue music as a life career. At the age of 11, he joined his parents church choir and started playings the drums. Later on, he also learnt how to play the keyboard before finally resolving to playing the acoustic guitar.

Clef nite studied music education and classical guitar studies at The University of Nigeria, Nsukka and now currently a student of Berklee College of Music studying contemporary writing and production with major on Voice.

Career
After graduating from high school in 1999 he got admitted at University of Nigeria Nsukka to study music education and classical guitar studies. In 2005, while performing in one of his school shows, he got discovered by a popular Abuja-based Nigerian music producer Mekoyo who also produced the hit track Olufunmi for Styl Plus. Same year, he relocated to Abuja to work with him as an assistant music producer at C Mountain Studios and that was where he met and worked with Styl Plus as a guitarist and that marked his first official gig as he continued to work and produced for other people.

Later in 2008, he relocated to Lagos as a music producer. Got signed to Alec's Entertainment as the in-house producer and worked with some popular Nigerian artists like Ruggedman, Kefee. Upon his moving to Lagos, news about his stylish playing got to Peter of P Square and he was invited to audition for him.

Later in 2009, he was invited to play the guitar for P Square as they decided to change their style of performance to all live band following the launch of their Danger Album. He successfully played and toured with them.

In 2012 he performed with Nneka and Black Thought on BET106 & Park on the program Music Matters.

 Later same year, he also performed with Nneka on MTV Iggy Unplugged These performances currently landed him a historic landmark as he became the very first Nigerian guitarist to perform live on two major US TV networks.

In the wake of the 2013 Boston Marathon bombings, Clef nite composed a tribute song for the city of Boston which he titled Boston Song. His tribute got so many reviews and was listed on some major Boston new media like The Boston Globe, Cambridge Day, Patch.

Clef nite is also a music producer and the founder of an independent music production company known as Music Republic Records.

References

Living people
Nigerian guitarists
1985 births
University of Nigeria alumni
21st-century guitarists
Berklee College of Music alumni